Clyde Pearson Glosson (born January 22, 1947) is a former American football wide receiver. He played for the Buffalo Bills in 1970.

References

1947 births
Living people
American football wide receivers
UTEP Miners football players
Buffalo Bills players